The House at 23 Avon Street in Wakefield, Massachusetts is one of the town's finest examples of Italianate.  It was built about 1855, and was listed on the National Register of Historic Places in 1989.

Description and history
Avon Street is a residential street running east–west between Main Street and North Street, both major north–south through streets, which serve the downtown and railroad corridor respectively.  Number 23 is a -story clapboarded wood-frame structure with a T-shaped plan, set on a lot fronted by a low granite retaining wall.  It has a cross-gabled roof with wide eaves with paired corner brackets, an Italianate hallmark, and windows with corniced lintels and footed sills.  The main facade is three bays wide, with the entrance in the left bay, sheltered by an enclosed gable-roof vestibule.  A segmented-arch window is set in the gable.  A two-story sections extends to the left at a recess, and is fronted by a single-story porch with paneled square posts and brackets at the eave. A 20th-century garage stands at the rear of the property.

Avon Street was laid out in 1848 on the former estate of Lemuel Sweetser, a local shoe manufacturer.  This house was built about 1855, as part of a trend in which high-quality upper-class housing was built to the west of downtown Wakefield.  It is one of the finer examples of high-style Italianate architecture in the town.

See also
House at 25 Avon Street
National Register of Historic Places listings in Wakefield, Massachusetts
National Register of Historic Places listings in Middlesex County, Massachusetts

References

Houses in Wakefield, Massachusetts
Houses on the National Register of Historic Places in Wakefield, Massachusetts
Italianate architecture in Massachusetts
Houses completed in 1855